"Julia" is a song by British singer-songwriter Chris Rea, released in October 1993 as the lead single from his 13th studio album, Espresso Logic (1993). The song, written and produced by Rea, was dedicated to Rea's daughter Julia Christina, who was four years old at the time of its release. The song reached No. 18 in the UK and remained on the UK Singles Chart for five weeks.

Critical reception
On its release, Music & Media noted the song's "hard hammering drums" and felt the song was the "first sensation of the [Espresso Logic] album's fine aroma". Alan Jones from Music Week gave it three out of five, writing, "'Burundi Black'-style tribal drums usher in one of Chris Rea's less intense tracks, a pleasant bop-along song. Rea's fans are used to more weighty fare, but once they get over the shock they'll warm to it." In a review of Espresso Logic, Allen Howie of The Courier-Journal commented, "Rea's most potent songs are personal, rather than political. When he's content with his lot in life, as in the sunny 'Julia', there's no keeping the smile from your face." Rob Caldwell of AllMusic described the song as a "bright rhythm driven song". In a review of the 1994 compilation The Best of Chris Rea, Katherine Monk of The Vancouver Sun described the song as "locomotive".

Track listings
 7-inch single
 "Julia" – 3:56
 "I Thought I Was Going to Lose You" – 5:00

 CD single (German release)
 "Julia" – 3:56
 "I Thought I Was Going to Lose You" – 5:01
 "Jordan 191" – 4:02

Personnel
 Chris Rea - vocals, guitar, producer
 Linda Taylor - backing vocals
 Sylvin Marc - bass
 Martin Ditcham - drums, percussion
 Stuart Epps - engineer
 Tommy Willis - guitar technician
 Stylorouge - sleeve design

Charts

References

1993 songs
1993 singles
Chris Rea songs
Songs written by Chris Rea
East West Records singles